La Tierra del Olvido (The Forgotten Land) is the seventh album by Colombian singer/composer Carlos Vives. The album was released on July 25, 1995, and contained a split of vallenato covers, as well as Vives' first foray into original compositions in the vallenato style. The album was nominated for a Lo Nuestro Award for Tropical/Salsa Album of the Year. The album consolidated Vives as Colombia's most famous musician at the time of its release.

Track listing
 "Pa' Mayté" (Andrés Castro, Carlos Iván Medina, Carlos Vives) – 3:07
 "Fidelina" (Alejo Durán) – 4:22
 "La Tierra del Olvido" (Vives, Iván Benavides) – 4:25
 "Zoila" (Toño Fernández) – 4:23
 "Rosa" (Irene Martínez) – 4:12
 "Agua" (Benavides, Ernesto Ocampo) – 3:52
 "La Cachucha Bacana" (Durán) – 4:21
 "Diosa Coronada" (Leandro Díaz) – 4:14
 "La Puya Puyá" (Egidio Cuadrado) – 5:00
 "Ella" (Benavides) – 3:47
 "Jam en Jukümey" (Benavides, Ocampo, Vives, Mayte Montero, Medina) – 1:30

Album credits 

Performance credits
Carlos Vives – Primary Artist, Director, Vocals
Egidio Cuadrado – Accordion, Vocals (La Puya Puyá), Backing Vocals
Carlos Ivan Medina – Background Vocals, Choir, Chorus, Keyboards
Mayte Montero – Background Vocals, Choir, Chorus, Gaita, Percussion, Vocals
Luis Angel Pastor – Bass
Gilbert Martínez – Conga, Marimbas, Marimbula, Percussion
Pablo Bernal – Drums
Eder Polo – Guacharaca
Ernesto "Teto" Ocampo – Guitar, Vocals
Alfredo Rosado – Tamboura, Timbales

Technical credits
La Provincia – Arranger
José Luis Diazgranados – Artwork
José Rincón – Contributor
Chris Lawson – Engineer
Carlos Vives – Graphic Design, Producer
Jerry Lofaro – Illustrations
Alfonso Bulla – Logistics
Iván Benavides – Producer
Richard Blair – Producer
Ernesto "Teto" Ocampo – Producer
Luis Angel Pastor – Producer
Michael Fuller – Mastering

Charts

Weekly charts

Year-end charts

See also
List of number-one Billboard Tropical Albums from the 1990s

Notes

External links 
 Carlos Vives official homepage

1995 albums
Carlos Vives albums